William Lamar Bethea (born January 1, 1942), nicknamed "Spot", is a retired American professional baseball player who appeared in ten games in the Major Leagues as an infielder for the  Minnesota Twins. He attended the University of Texas at Austin.

Originally signed by the St. Louis Cardinals in 1963, Bethea batted .371 in the Pioneer League (then Class A) that season and was selected by the Twins in the first-year player draft then in effect. He spent most of 1964 with the Double–A Charlotte Hornets before his recall to Minnesota after the September 1 roster expansion.

In his first MLB at bat (in his fourth game played), on September 20, 1964, at Fenway Park, Bethea doubled off Ed Connolly of the Boston Red Sox, driving home Bob Allison from first base for his first run batted in in the Majors. It sparked the Twins to a 12–4 victory. In his brief big-league trial, however, Bethea collected only five total hits and two RBI in ten games played and 30 at bats.  He returned to the minor leagues in 1965 and played through the 1969 season.  He then served as an assistant coach for the Texas Longhorns baseball program for 21 years, working as an aide to Cliff Gustafson, before becoming head baseball coach of Arkansas State University from 1991–2002, compiling a 311–310 record.

References

External links

 Baseball Almanac

1942 births
Living people
All-American college baseball players
Arkansas State Red Wolves baseball coaches
Baseball coaches from Texas
Baseball players from Houston
Billings Mustangs players
Binghamton Triplets players
Charlotte Hornets (baseball) players
Columbus Confederate Yankees players
El Paso Sun Kings players
Hawaii Islanders players
Major League Baseball infielders
Minnesota Twins players
Texas Longhorns baseball coaches
Texas Longhorns baseball players
Toledo Mud Hens players
Tulsa Oilers (baseball) players